Phyllis Amanda Peterson (July 8, 1971 – July 3, 2015) was an American actress, most known for her role as Cindy Mancini in the 1987 comedy film Can't Buy Me Love.

Early life
Peterson was born in Greeley, Colorado, the youngest of three children born to James Peterson, an ear, nose, and throat specialist, and his wife Sylvia. She had two older siblings: a sister, Anne Marie and a brother, James, Jr. Peterson began acting as a child and used the name "Amanda Peterson" in a professional capacity. In the beginning of her career, she used the name "Mandy Peterson", which was what friends and family called her.

Career
Peterson made her stage debut at age seven as Gretl in the University of Northern Colorado's stage production of The Sound of Music. At 11, she won a role in the musical film Annie as a dancing extra. Peterson went on to land guest spots on Father Murphy and Silver Spoons. She also appeared in more than 50 television commercials. During the 1983–84 television season, she co-starred as Squirt Sawyer on the NBC drama series Boone. Boone was canceled after one season.

In 1985, Peterson won her first starring role in the feature film Explorers. The next year, she co-starred as "Sunny Sisk" in the Emmy Award-winning miniseries A Year in the Life. The miniseries was highly acclaimed; it was the third-highest-rated miniseries of the 1986–87 U.S. television season with a 16.9/27 rating/share. Later it was adapted into a television series of the same name and aired on NBC from 1987 to 1988. For her work on the series, Peterson won a Young Artist Award for Best Young Actress Starring in a Television Drama Series. Despite being well received, A Year in the Life was canceled after one season.

In 1986, 15-year-old Peterson was cast in the teen comedy Boy Rents Girl, opposite Patrick Dempsey. The film was shot on location in Tucson, Arizona. The title was later changed to Can't Buy Me Love after producers secured the rights to The Beatles' 1964 song of the same name. Released in the summer of 1987, Can't Buy Me Love received mixed reviews but became the sleeper hit of the summer. After its release, Peterson and Dempsey obtained teen idol status and subsequently appeared on the covers of teen magazines such as Tiger Beat and Teen Beat.

In a September 2015 interview with talk show The Doctors, Peterson's family revealed that she was raped at age 15 and had not disclosed it at the time.

In 1988, Peterson co-starred in a Roger Corman production, the post-apocalyptic film The Lawless Land, followed by a role in the 1989 teen drama Listen to Me. Later that year, she returned to Greeley, where she graduated from University High School (while working in Los Angeles, she was privately tutored). Shortly after graduating, she starred in the television movie Fatal Charm. That fall, Peterson enrolled at Middlebury College., where she appeared in a black box production of the Sarah Daniels play Masterpieces. While on semester break, she appeared in a guest spot on Doogie Howser, M.D. Later that year, Peterson dropped out of Middlebury College. In 1994, she returned to acting in the fantasy film WindRunner in a role alongside Jason Wiles. It was Peterson's final onscreen role.

Later years
In 1994, Peterson retired from the entertainment industry and returned to her hometown of Greeley. According to her father, she left Hollywood to "choose a new path in her life." After briefly attending Middlebury College, she enrolled at Colorado State University for a year. Peterson later studied at the University of Northern Colorado. In 2012, she briefly modeled for a Colorado photographer.

Peterson was twice married and had two children. She was first married to Joseph Robert Skutvik. After their divorce, she married David Hartley. Peterson and Hartley were reportedly divorced at the time of her death.

Between October 2000 and May 2012, Peterson was arrested five times for the offenses of third-degree assault, harassment, DUI, and possession of drug paraphernalia and suspicion of distributing a Schedule 2 controlled substance. From September to December 2005, she spent nearly three months in jail. Peterson's last arrests were for a misdemeanor DUI and possession of narcotics equipment charge in April 2012, and suspicion of child abuse in May 2012, which was later dropped. According to her father, she had previously struggled with drug issues, but was drug-free at the time of her death and had become "quite religious." He also said that, in recent years, Peterson had had sleep apnea and bouts of pneumonia and sinusitis. For the last three years of her life, Peterson was receiving disability benefits and lived alone in an apartment in Greeley.

Death
On , 2015, Peterson was reported missing. She was found dead at her home at age 43, five days before her 44th birthday. While the Greeley police did not comment on specific details due to an ongoing investigation, they said Peterson's apartment door was unlocked but there were no signs of foul play.

During an interview with Entertainment Tonight shortly after Peterson's death, her mother stated that while her daughter had issues with drugs when she was younger, she believed her to be drug-free when she died and that her death "was not in any way a drug thing."

The medical examiner determined that Peterson died of an accidental drug overdose. According to the coroner's report, Peterson had undergone a hysterectomy shortly before her death and was prescribed Gabapentin for post-surgical pain management. She was taking morphine at the time of her death; according to the report, she obtained the drug from a friend a week before she died. The coroner's report concluded Peterson experienced a "morphine effect" that triggered respiratory failure leading to her death. Peterson was later cremated.

Filmography

Awards and nominations

See also
List of solved missing person cases: post-2000

References

External links
 
 

1971 births
2015 deaths
2010s missing person cases
20th-century American actresses
21st-century American women
Accidental deaths in Colorado
Actresses from Colorado
American child actresses
American film actresses
American musical theatre actresses
American stage actresses
American television actresses
Colorado State University alumni
Drug-related deaths in Colorado
Formerly missing people
Middlebury College alumni
Missing person cases in Colorado
People from Greeley, Colorado
University of Northern Colorado alumni